Pyrrhocoroidea is a superfamily of true bugs in the infraorder Pentatomomorpha.

References

 
Hemiptera superfamilies